Joseph Anthony Pepitone (October 9, 1940 – March 13, 2023) was an American professional baseball first baseman and outfielder who played in Major League Baseball (MLB) for the New York Yankees, Houston Astros, Chicago Cubs, and Atlanta Braves from 1962 to 1973 and for the Yakult Atoms of Nippon Professional Baseball in 1973. Pepitone was a three-time MLB All-Star and won three Gold Glove Awards.

Early life
Pepitone was born in Brooklyn, New York, and raised in Park Slope. He had two younger brothers. Pepitone attended Manual Training High School.

Pepitone was shot by a classmate at age 17 while at school, the same week that his father died at age 39 due to a stroke. He did not press charges against the shooter.

Baseball career

New York Yankees

In August 1958, Pepitone signed with the New York Yankees as an amateur free agent. He played in 16 games for the Auburn Yankees of the Class D New York-Pennsylvania League after signing.

After playing four seasons in the minor leagues, he broke in with the Yankees in 1962, playing behind Moose Skowron at first base. He batted .239 in 63 games in 1962. Yankees management believed he could handle the first base job and traded Skowron to the Los Angeles Dodgers before the 1963 season. Pepitone batted .271 with 27 home runs and 89 runs batted in (RBIs) in 1963. In the 1963 World Series, he committed a costly error. With the score tied 1–1 in the seventh inning of Game Four, he lost a routine Clete Boyer throw in the white shirtsleeves of the Los Angeles crowd, and the batter, Jim Gilliam, went all the way to third base and scored the Series-winning run on a sacrifice fly by Willie Davis. In 1964, Pepitone batted .251 with 28 home runs and 100 RBIs. In the 1964 World Series against the St. Louis Cardinals, he hit a grand slam in Game 6, but the Yankees lost the series.

Pepitone batted .247 in 1965 and .255 in 1966, as the Yankees finished 70–89. He batted .251 in 139 games in 1967 and .245 in 108 games in 1968. Pepitone began to feud with the Yankees in 1969, leaving the team without permission for two days in August. He batted .242 with 27 home runs in the 1969 season.

Later career
After the 1969 season, despite having won his third Gold Glove Award, the Yankees traded Pepitone to the Houston Astros for Curt Blefary. Unhappy with how he was treated by the Astros, he threatened to retire in July 1970. The Astros sold Pepitone to the Chicago Cubs on waivers a week later. In Chicago, Pepitone replaced Ernie Banks at first base. Pepitone retired in May 1972, but returned to the Cubs after a few weeks away from the team. The Cubs traded Pepitone to the Atlanta Braves for Andre Thornton, and cash considerations on May 19, 1973. In Atlanta, he played only three games, after which he announced his intention to retire.

Pepitone then announced his intention to continue his career in Japan. In June 1973, Pepitone accepted an offer of $70,000 ($ today) a year to play for the Yakult Atoms in Nippon Professional Baseball's Central League. In July, he returned to the United States. While in Japan, he hit .163 with one home run and two RBIs in 14 games played. Pepitone spent his brief career in Japan skipping games for claimed injuries only to be seen out at night in discos, behavior which led the Japanese to adopt his name into their vernacular—as a word meaning "goof off".

Life after baseball

Memoirs
Jim Bouton wrote about Pepitone in his 1970 book Ball Four. Bouton said that Pepitone went nowhere without a bag containing hair products for his rapidly balding head and that he took to wearing toupees.

In January 1975, Pepitone published his own tell-all baseball memoir, titled Joe, You Coulda Made Us Proud. The book received substantial attention for its many revelations, particularly about his abusive father and his self-lacerating candor about his self-destructive ways. Later that year, he posed nude for Foxy Lady magazine, featuring full frontal nudity.

Professional softball career 
The American Professional Slo-Pitch League (APSPL) was the first of several men's professional slow-pitch softball leagues were formed in the United States during the late 1970s and early 1980s, building on the growth and talent in the booming men's amateur game during this period.

Pepitone joined the Trenton Statesmen of the APSL, and put up respectable numbers in 1978 (110–225, .489, 14 HRs, 61 RBIs) and 1979 (50–122, .410, 9 HRs, 30 RBIs). The Detroit Caesars offered $30,000 to the Statesmen to buy Pepitone's contract in 1978.  That offer was rejected.  After the Trenton franchise disbanded in 1979, Pepitone became the team president and first baseman for Chicago Nationwide Advertising of the North American Softball League (NASL) during their 1980 season. Pepitone was suspended for six games by NASL Commissioner Robert Brown for "conduct detrimental to professional softball" and then was lost for the season in August with a thigh injury.  The Yankees then hired him as a minor league hitting instructor at the end of the NASL season, bringing his professional softball career to a close.

MLB coaching 
In October 1980, Pepitone was hired as a minor league hitting coach with the Yankees and brought to the major league club in June 1982.  He was replaced by Lou Pinella in August of that summer.  Yankee owner George Steinbrenner again hired Pepitone in 1988 after release from prison to serve in the development of minor league players.  Pepitone received a 1999 World Series ring for his relationship with the Yankees.  He subsequently sold that ring at auction.

Personal life
Pepitone and two other men were arrested in Brooklyn on March 18, 1985, after being stopped by the police for running a red light. The car contained nine ounces of cocaine, 344 quaaludes, a free-basing kit, a pistol, and about $6,300 in cash. Pepitone denied knowing there were drugs and guns in the vehicle. He spent four months at Rikers Island jail in 1988 for two misdemeanor drug convictions.

In January 1992, Pepitone was charged with misdemeanor assault in Kiamesha Lake, New York, after a scuffle police said was triggered when Pepitone was called a "has-been." He was arraigned in town court and released after he posted $75 bail. In October 1995, the 55-year-old Pepitone was arrested and charged with driving while intoxicated after losing control of his car in New York City's Queens-Midtown Tunnel. Police found Pepitone bloodied, disoriented, and mumbling as he walked through the tunnel. Authorities charged Pepitone with drunken driving after he refused to take a sobriety test.  Pepitone pleaded guilty. When asked if he was staying away from alcohol, Pepitone responded, "I don't drink that much."

Pepitone was married three times, all ending in divorce. He had five children.

Pepitone died at his daughter's home in Kansas City, Missouri, on March 13, 2023, at age 82.

References

Sources

Books
Bouton, Jim, and Leonard Shecter. Ball Four; My Life and Hard Times Throwing the Knuckleball in the Big Leagues. New York: World Pub. Co., 1970. 400 pages.
Pepitone, Joe, and Berry Stainback. Joe, You Coulda Made Us Proud. Chicago: Playboy Press, 1975. 246 pages.
Pepitone, William A., and Joseph V. Soul of a Yankee: The Iron Horse, the Babe and the Battle for Joe Pepitone. Morrisville, North Carolina: Self-Published through lulu.com, 2011. 130 pages.

Newspapers
Yanks Harvest Bumper Farm Crop; Well-Balanced Array of Minor Leaguers Aids Champions All-Star Rookie Cast Includes Sons of Keller, Tresh – Mike Tresh's Son on List – New York Times article, January 3, 1962
BROOKLYN TALENT AT YANKEE CAMP; Pepitone Stands Out – New York Times article, February 8, 1962
YANKEE ROOKIES RATED BEST EVER; Houk Praises Tresh, Gibbs, Linz, Pepitone and Keller – New York Times article, February 25, 1962
Mantle, Boyer Hit Homers As Yanks Top Orioles, 4–1; Yanks Turn Back Orioles, 4 to 1, On Homers by Mantle and Boyer – New York Times article, March 11, 1962
Sports of The Times; Overheard at the Stadium – Time Marches On – Nuisance Hitter – The Hollywood Touch – New York Times article, April 11, 1962
The Joe Pepitone Prayer: Don't Let Me Die in Japan; For 12 years—from 1962 – Joe Pepitone played first and outfield for the New York Yankees, Houston Astros and Chicago Cubs – New York Times article, May 19, 1974
PEPITONE ARRESTED ON DRUG CHARGES – New York Times article, March 20, 1985
Pepitone Is Indicted – New York Times article, May 4, 1985
SPORTS PEOPLE; Pepitone Trial Starts – New York Times article, August 27, 1986
PEPITONE IS GUILTY OF LESSER CHARGES – New York Times article, September 18, 1986
PEPITONE SENTENCED TO SIX MONTHS IN JAIL – New York Times article, October 23, 1986
Pepitone to Begin 6-Month Jail Term – New York Times article, May 17, 1988
Pepitone Is Released – New York Times article, September 15, 1988
SPORTS PEOPLE: BASEBALL; Pepitone Is Arrested – New York Times article, October 26, 1995

External links

Joe Pepitone at Baseballbiography.com

1940 births
2023 deaths
American expatriate baseball players in Japan
American League All-Stars
American memoirists
Male softball players
American shooting survivors
Atlanta Braves players
Baseball players from New York (state)
Chicago Cubs players
Gold Glove Award winners
Hawaii Islanders players
Houston Astros players
Major League Baseball first basemen
Major League Baseball outfielders
New York Yankees coaches
New York Yankees players
People from Massapequa, New York
People from Park Slope
Sportspeople from Brooklyn
Baseball players from New York City
Yakult Atoms players
Amarillo Gold Sox players
Auburn Yankees players
Binghamton Triplets players
Fargo-Moorhead Twins players
Richmond Virginians (minor league) players
American people of Italian descent
People from Bay Ridge, Brooklyn